Justin Wilmeth (born June 26, 1979) is an American politician who is one of the Arizona state representatives in Arizona's 2nd district. He was elected to the 15th district in 2020 after incumbent Republican Nancy Barto decided to run for Arizona Senate. He and Steve Kaiser won in a twoseat election in 2020, both defeating Democrat Kristin DybvigPawelko by over 11,000 votes. He was reelected to the 2nd district in 2022, following redistricting.

Early life 
Wilmeth was born in Odessa, Texas, on June 26, 1979. He was born to a family of farmers hailing from the Texas and Oklahoma panhandles. His parents moved to California in 1985. He grew up in the San Fernando Valley region of Los Angeles and attended both private and public schools. He spent the bulk of his childhood acting professionally, appearing in stage plays, national commercials and the Phil Collins music video "Do you Remember?" He has had a Screen Actors Guild Card since 1987.

After his parents' divorce, his mom moved he, his sister and his brother to Trinidad, Colorado, where she finished nursing school. She found a job in Oklahoma City, moving the family there in 1995. Justin, his mother and his two siblings lived in a small apartment in west Oklahoma City during his high school years, graduating from Putnam City West High School in 1998.

Pre-Political career 
After spending his early 20s working a series of odd jobs including a barbecue restaurant, Wilmeth helped a high school friend run for the Oklahoma State Legislature in 2004. That friend, Trebor Worthen, won a seat in the Oklahoma House of Representatives. It was also the first time in 80 years the Republican Party held the House majority. After a staff shake-up, Wilmeth served as a communications specialist for 10 years. He also worked as the deputy state director of Americans for Prosperity and multiple political campaigns in Oklahoma. Wilmeth moved to Arizona in July 2015 and, a few months later, secured a job at the Arizona House of Representatives as a majority policy advisor. He worked there until late 2017, when he was named campaign manager for the Phil Lovas for Congress campaign in a special election. Lovas came in second to current Congresswoman Debbie Lesko. Immediately after that, Wilmeth was named campaign manager for the Steve Gaynor for Secretary of State campaign. The election was controversial, as the Associated Press initially called the race for Gaynor with over 600,000 votes left to count. As the votes were further counted, Hobbs opened up a lead and won the election.

Political career 
Wilmeth was first approached to run for one of the two open House seats in Legislative District 15 by a friend. That eventually led to a meeting with Nancy Barto, who encouraged him to run for the House and join her on a conservative Republican slate. Wilmeth, Barto and Steve Kaiser formed a team and all three won election in the 2020 campaign cycle.

In his first two-year term at the Arizona House of Representatives, he was the prime sponsor of 18 bills that were signed into law.

During his first term, Wilmeth was a part of the Commerce, Health and Transportation committees. He was the vice chairman of Transportation under Frank Carroll.

In 2022, he was named to the 2022 GOPAC Emerging Leaders Class, a prestigious award recognizing the top young legislators nationally.

Education 
Wilmeth earned a Bachelor of Science degree in Political Science from Arizona State University in 2013 and a Master of Public Administration from Arizona State in 2019. Wilmeth is currently working on completing a Master of Arts in Global Security from Arizona State.

Personal life 
Wilmeth is divorced. He resides in the Deer Valley region of far North Phoenix.

References

Living people
Republican Party members of the Arizona House of Representatives
21st-century American politicians
1979 births